AMAPCEO, formerly known as the Association of Management, Administrative and Professional Crown Employees of Ontario, is a Canadian trade union representing mid-level public servants in Ontario. It was founded in 1992, recognized as a union by the provincial government in 1995, and negotiated its first collective agreement in 1996.  , AMAPCEO represents over 14,000 professional and supervisory public servants who either work directly for the Government of Ontario in the Ontario Public Service (OPS) or in seven bargaining units outside the OPS in the Broader Public Sector (BPS). It is the second largest public sector union in Ontario after the Ontario Public Service Employees Union, which generally represents more blue-collar workers.

Overview 
Of Canada's ten provinces and three territories, Ontario is the most populous (at 14.3 million in April 2018, constituting almost 40 per cent of the Canadian population) and the second largest in area (1.076 million km²).  Ontario's political system is based on the Westminster system of parliamentary democracy and the career public service is apolitical and non-partisan, providing objective advice to, and implementing decisions of, successive governments, regardless of the political party that is elected to form the government at any given time.

AMAPCEO-represented employees in the OPS work in every government ministry and in a number of agencies, boards and commissions in over 130 cities and towns across Ontario, and in twelve cities outside Canada.  About eighty per cent of AMAPCEO members work in the provincial capital city of Toronto.  Members include: policy analysts, financial analysts, auditors, economists, mediators, arbitrators, educators, information technology professionals, scientists, chaplains, veterinarians, program supervisors, clinical co-ordinators, psychiatric patient advocates, media relations and communications officers, epidemiologists, arts granting officers and many others.  The union also represents senior economic officers in the Ontario Ministry of Economic Development, Job Creation and Trade, who are based in Canadian high commissions, embassies and consulates abroad.

, AMAPCEO represents over 14,000 professional and supervisory public servants.

The seven BPS bargaining units consist of the:  

 Financial Services Regulatory Authority of Ontario, an independent agency created to improve consumer and pension plan beneficiary protections;
 Office of the Ontario Child Advocate, originally established as an independent office of the Legislative Assembly of Ontario and now the Children and Youth Unit in the Office of the Ombudsman (also an independent office of the Legislature); 
 Public Health Ontario, an independent provincial Crown agency;
 Waypoint Centre for Mental Health Care (formerly the Penetanguishene Mental Health Centre), which was the final psychiatric hospital divested from direct provincial government control;
 Evidence Development and Standards Department at Health Quality Ontario, now part of the broader agency known as Ontario Health), responsible for promoting and measuring quality assurance in the health-care sector;
 Ontario Arts Council, an independent agency that promotes and funds artists and arts organizations; and,
 Office of the French Language Services Commissioner, originally established as an independent office of the Legislative Assembly, but now part of the Office of the Ombudsman

AMAPCEO also had a BPS unit representing the Ontario Racing Commission until its 2016 merger with the Alcohol and Gaming Commission of Ontario.

History 
Until February 1994, when the Crown Employees Collective Bargaining Act was amended, the mid-level professionals in the Ontario public service now represented by AMAPCEO did not have collective bargaining rights and could not legally form a union. The larger Ontario Public Service Employees Union (OPSEU) had lobbied the Ontario government for decades to extend collective bargaining to this group. In 1992, what would become AMAPCEO started as a grassroots organization representing the mid-level professionals of the Ontario public service. In 1993, AMAPCEO negotiated a Social Contract sectoral framework agreement with the provincial government on behalf of 12,000 non-unionized civil servants.

OPSEU attempted to win certification as the bargaining agent for the majority of the approximately 7000 employees with newly-granted collective bargaining rights. However, its insistence that existing OPSEU members would have seniority over all potential new members was unpopular. The potential new members also identified as professionals and not blue-collar workers. OPSEU's organizing drive failed and AMAPCEO decided to operate as a separate union. In January 1995, AMAPCEO was certified by the Ontario Labour Relations Board as the bargaining agent for its 4,600 members. The union was voluntary recognized by Premier Bob Rae's government as an official bargaining agent shortly afterwards. 

The new union began negotiating its first collective-bargaining agreement with the provincial government in October 1995. Negotiations lasted until March 1996, when shortly after an OPSEU strike began, the Ontario government was incentivized to reach a deal with AMAPCEO that they could use as a precedent to strengthen their position in the OPSEU strike negotiations.

In 2014, the AMAPCEO negotiated a new, four-year collective agreement with the government of Premier Kathleen Wynne, which was eager to reduce government spending. The new deal had zero increases in the first two years and 1.4% in the last two years. At the end of the year, longtime president Gary Gannage, who had held the role since November 1995 during negotiations of AMAPCEO's first contract, retired.

In March 2022, the AMAPCEO unsuccessfully lobbied the government of Premier Doug Ford  so that vaccine passports, mandatory vaccination, and masking would remain in OPS workplaces when the government transitioned back to in-person work during the COVID-19 pandemic in Canada.

Governance 
Under a governance structure implemented on January 1, 2017, members are assigned to one of eleven geographic Districts based on where they work; there are eight Districts in the City of Toronto and three outside Toronto, proportionate to the distribution of AMAPCEO members across the province.  Ten of the Districts are about the same size (roughly between 1,000 and 1,300 members), with the Northern District slightly smaller.  The AMAPCEO Board of Directors consists of fifteen members:  the four executive officers (President, Vice-President, Secretary and Treasurer), who are elected by Delegates at the annual convention, and eleven Directors, each elected from and by the members in one of the 11 Districts.

The Board Director in each District presides over a District Executive Committee, consisting of that District's Delegates, who are elected roughly on the basis of one Delegate for every 50 members.  The annual convention consists of the fifteen members of the Board of Directors plus all Delegates - just over 200 in total at the present time.  (In addition to participating as members of their Districts, members in each of the six BPS bargaining units separately elect one dedicated Delegate from their unit, to ensure that all bargaining units are represented at the annual convention.)  All Delegates and members of the AMAPCEO Board serve two-year terms, staggered so that approximately one-half of the Delegates, Directors and executive officers are elected annually. AMAPCEO employs 45+ full-time professional staff who provide advice and services to members from an office in Toronto (located at 1 Dundas Street West at the corner of Dundas and Yonge Streets, a location close to where most members work and where most of the union's employer counterparts are based).  All employees in the office, except for the senior management staff, are members of a bargaining unit represented by the national Canadian union, Unifor.

Presidents 
Before being elected to his first term as President (which started on January 1, 2015), Dave Bulmer, worked as a professional educator in London for the Ministry of Health and Long-Term Care.  He has subsequently been re-elected a number of times.  He previously served as AMAPCEO's Treasurer and before that, as a Director on the Board. The Presidents of AMAPCEO include:

 Janet Ballantyne, 1992-1995
 Gary Gannage, 1995-2014
 Dave Bulmer, 2015

References

External links
AMAPCEO website 

Trade unions in Ontario
1992 establishments in Ontario
Trade unions established in 1992